The right to social security  is recognized as a human right and establishes the right to social security assistance for those unable to work due to sickness, disability, maternity, employment injury, unemployment or old age. Social security systems provided for by states consist of social insurance programs, which provide earned benefits for workers and their families by employment contributions, and/or social assistance programs which provide non-contributory benefits designed to provide minimum levels of social security to persons unable to access social insurance.

Universal Declaration of Human Rights 
The Universal Declaration of Human Rights recognises the right to social security in articles 22, which states that:
"Everyone, as a member of society, has the right to social security
 and is entitled to realization, through national effort and international co-operation and in accordance with the organization and resources of each State, of the economic, social and cultural rights indispensable for his dignity and the free development of his personality."
And article 25, which enshrines the right to an adequate standard of living, stating that:
"(1) Everyone has the right to a standard of living adequate for the health and well-being of himself and of his family, including food, clothing, housing and medical care and necessary social services, and the right to security in the event of unemployment, sickness, disability, widowhood, old age or other lack of livelihood in circumstances beyond his control.
(2) Motherhood and childhood are entitled to special care and assistance. All children, whether born in or out of wedlock, shall enjoy the same social protection."

International Covenant on Economic, Social and Cultural Rights 
Article 9 of the International Covenant on Economic, Social and Cultural Rights (ICESCR) recognises "the right of everyone to social security, including social insurance." The right to social security is furthermore recognised in Article 10, which states that "special protection should be accorded to mothers during a reasonable period before and after childbirth. During such period working mothers should be accorded paid leave or leave with adequate social security benefits." State parties to the ICESCR have the obligation to respect, protect and fulfil the right to social security. In the General Comment no 19 (2007) On the Right to Social Security the UN Committee on Economic, Social and Cultural Rights clarified that the right to social security as enshrined in the ICESCR encompasses: 
"the right to access and maintain benefits, whether in cash or in kind, from (a) lack of work-related income caused by sickness, disability, maternity, employment injury, unemployment, old age, or death of a family member; (b) unaffordable access to health care; (c) insufficient family support, particularly children and adult dependents"
Social security is understood to encompass the following nine branches: adequate health service, disability benefits, old age benefits, unemployment benefits, employment injury insurance, family and child support, maternity benefits, disability protections, and provisions for survivors and orphans. State parties to the ICESCR have the obligation to fulfil the right to social security by adopting "the necessary measures, including the implementation of a social security scheme". State parties must ensure that "the social security system will be adequate, accessible for everyone and will cover social risks and contingencies". State parties also have an obligation to facilitate the right to social security by sufficiently "recognizing this right within the national political and legal systems, preferably by way of legislative implementation" and "adopting a national social security strategy".

Other international human rights instruments 
The right to social security is also recognised in the Convention on the Elimination of All Forms of Racial Discrimination which in article five requires that State parties must prohibit and eliminate racial discrimination in all of its forms, and to guarantee the right of everyone "without distinction as to race, colour, or national or ethnic origin, to equality before the law, notably in the enjoyment of... the right to public health, medical care, social security and social services". The Convention on the Elimination of All Forms of Discrimination Against Women enshrines the right to social security for women in article 11, stating that women have "the right to social security, particularly in cases of retirement, unemployment, sickness, invalidity and old age and other incapacity to work, as well as the right to paid leave."

The Convention on the Rights of the Child enshrines the right of children to social security in article 26, stating that:
"(1) States Parties shall recognize for every child the right to benefit from social security, including social insurance, and shall take the necessary measures to achieve the full realization of this right in accordance with their national law.
(2) The benefits should, where appropriate, be granted, taking into account the resources and the circumstances of the child and persons having responsibility for the maintenance of the child, as well as any other consideration relevant to an application for benefits made by or on behalf of the child." 
The Convention further elaborates on the right of children to social security in article 18 in relation to working parents, stating that "States Parties shall render appropriate assistance to parents and legal guardians in the performance of their child-rearing responsibilities and shall ensure the development of institutions, facilities and services for the care of children." According to the Convention "States Parties shall take all appropriate measures to ensure that children of working parents have the right to benefit from child-care services and facilities for which they are eligible." Article 20 of the Convention makes provisions for the right to social security of children without parents, stating that "A child temporarily or permanently deprived of his or her family environment, or in whose own best interests cannot be allowed to remain in that environment, shall be entitled to special protection and assistance provided by the State." And that "States Parties shall in accordance with their national laws ensure alternative care for such a child."

Relationship with other rights 
The right to social security is interrelated and interdependent with other economic, social and cultural rights, in particular the right to an adequate standard of living, including the right to food and the right to housing, the right to work, and the right to protection of the family. According to the UN Human Rights Committee article 26 of the  International Covenant on Civil and Political Rights on discrimination applies to the right to social security. In a General Comment from 2000 the Committee highlighted the right to social security as an area where women are frequently subject of discrimination.

Implementation 
Globally the access to social security is low and 80 percent of the global population have no access to any formal social security protection.

See also 
 Right to health
 Right to water
 Right to work
 Basic Income

References 

Human rights by issue